Ghetto Organized is the only studio album by American hip hop group the Gambino Family. It was released on October 20, 1998, via No Limit Records and was entirely produced by Beats By The Pound. It features guest appearances from 241, Big Ed, C-Murder, Fiend, Full Blooded, Ghetto Commission, KLC, Mac, Magic, Master P, Mia X, Mo B. Dick, Mr. Serv-On, Mystikal, O'Dell, Porsha, QB, Silkk the Shocker and Snoop Dogg. The album peaked at number 17 on the Billboard 200 and number 3 on the Top R&B/Hip-Hop Albums chart selling 160,000 copies in its first week, but the group never released a follow-up and have not been heard of since. The tracks "Studio B" and "Childhood Years" were released as promotional singles.

Track listing

Charts

References

External links

1998 debut albums
Gambino Family (group) albums
No Limit Records albums
Priority Records albums